Glaze City is an unincorporated community in Gonzales County, Texas, United States. The community is located along Farm to Market Road 443 in the eastern part of the county.

History
Glaze City was founded in 1926; it took its name from one of its promoters. The community's population peaked at 90 in the 1940s, but had declined to ten by 1989; as of 2000, its population was still ten.

References

Unincorporated communities in Gonzales County, Texas
Unincorporated communities in Texas
1926 establishments in Texas
Populated places established in 1926